Denver Seminary is a private, Evangelical Christian seminary with its main campus in Littleton, Colorado, an online global campus, and an extension campus in Washington, DC. It offers Master of Arts (MA), Master of Divinity (M.Div.), Doctor of Ministry (D.Min.), and Master of Theology (MTS) degrees and has enrollment of more than 900 students. Denver Seminary adheres to the National Association of Evangelicals Statement of Faith.

History
Denver Seminary was founded in 1950 by members of the newly founded Conservative Baptist Association. This is a group of churches that separated from the Northern Baptist Convention over theological differences stemming from the Fundamentalist–Modernist Controversy conflict earlier in the twentieth century. The school was originally known as the Conservative Baptist Theological Seminary and, in 1982, changed its name to Denver Conservative Baptist Seminary. The school changed its name again in 1998 to Denver Seminary to reflect its growing appeal to a wide-spectrum of evangelical students. Students are required to sign the statement of faith used by the National Association of Evangelicals.

Carey Thomas became the Seminary's first president in 1950. In 1956, Vernon Grounds was appointed as the second president and remained so until 1979. During his tenure, Vernon Grounds was responsible for initiating, directing, and managing the Seminary's extensive growth and progress. In June 1962, Denver Seminary was granted associate membership in the American Association of Theological Schools (now the Association of Theological Schools). Full accreditation was achieved in the Association of Theological Schools in 1971 and in the North Central Association of Colleges and Secondary Schools in 1972. Forty-one years after Denver Seminary's inception (1991) the student body numbered over five hundred students who came from forty states, fifty-three denominations, and fifteen countries.

In 1996, Clyde McDowell, the fifth president, pioneered the groundbreaking effort behind becoming the first seminary ever to receive accreditation by the Council for Accreditation of Counseling and Related Education Programs (CACREP) for its counseling degree program. Additionally, McDowell reinvented the school's approach to seminary education by incorporating an intensive, contextualized mentoring experience into its core curriculum—a program of training and mentoring for which Denver Seminary has become well known.

In 2005, under the leadership of President Craig Williford, Denver Seminary moved from the Englewood, Colorado location to a new campus in Littleton, Colorado where the school currently resides. Built from the ground up specifically for the Seminary, the campus features an academic/leadership training center; a learning resource center (home to the library and student center); an administrative building, which includes the Shepherd's Gate Counseling Center; and nearly 100 student apartments. The campus is situated next to the historic South Platte River with views of the Rocky Mountains and access to running and biking trails along the river.

In 2002, Senior Professor of Church History Bruce Shelley authored a biography on Grounds titled Transformed by Love:The Vernon Grounds Story. This book gives a comprehensive overview of Denver Seminary's history as it developed from a small denominational school to a major evangelical seminary under Grounds' leadership.

Presidents
The following men have served in the presidency of Denver Seminary:

1. Carey S. Thomas, 1950-56
2. Vernon C. Grounds, 1956-1979
3. Haddon Robinson, 1979-1991
4. Edward L. Hayes, 1993-1996
5. Clyde McDowell, 1996-1999
6. Leith Anderson (interim president) 1999-2001
7. G. Craig Williford, 2001-2008
8. Mark Young, 2009–present

Accreditation 
Denver Seminary is accredited by Association of Theological Schools in the United States and Canada, Higher Learning Commission, the Association for Clinical Pastoral Education, and the Council for Accreditation of Counseling and Related Education Programs (CACREP).

Academics 
Denver Seminary offers Master of Divinity (MDiv), Master of Arts (MA), Counseling, and Master of Theology (ThM) degree programs, as well as Doctor of Ministry (DMiN) and Doctor of Philosophy in Counselor Education and Supervision degrees. They also offer graduate certificates that can be earned together with a degree or separately.

Theological stance 
The evangelical theological stance of Denver Seminary is captured by the words of the late chancellor Vernon Grounds:

Here is no unanchored liberalism, freedom to think without commitment. Here is no encrusted dogmatism, commitment without freedom to think. Here is a vibrant evangelicalism, commitment with freedom to think within the limits laid down in Scripture.

This statement was first used by Grounds to stake out Denver Seminary's theological position in the midst of conflict between moderately conservative and ultra-conservative factions of the Conservative Baptist Association that eventually led the ultra-conservative faction to withdraw from the CBA and found the Conservative Baptist Fellowship (CBF). Grounds, formerly the academic dean of fundamentalist Baptist seminary in New York state affiliated with the General Association of Regular Baptist Churches, eventually became a key spokesperson for the evangelical movement that attributes its roots to the writings of Carl F. H. Henry. Under his leadership, Denver Seminary became firmly rooted in this theological camp.

Publications 
Since 1998, Old Testament professor Richard Hess has edited the Denver Journal: An Online Review of Current Biblical and Theological Studies.  This is primarily an electronic journal that provides Denver Seminary faculty an opportunity to publish book reviews on the latest theological scholarship.

Engage Magazine is published biannually since 2013. The magazine features articles written by faculty addressing current topics in the church and ministry as well as stories of students and alumni. It is distributed to Denver Seminary alumni, students, staff, faculty, donors, and friends.

Library 
The Carey S. Thomas library is the largest evangelical protestant library between Chicago and Los Angeles. It is composed of volumes carefully selected to provide the best in theological and scholarly literature as an undergirding for the school's curriculum. The present collection totals approximately 185,000 volumes, both in print and electronic format, and is located in the main library in Littleton, Colorado and in the extension campus libraries in Washington DC and West Texas.

References

External links
 Official website

Seminaries and theological colleges in Colorado
Evangelical seminaries and theological colleges
Buildings and structures in Arapahoe County, Colorado
Education in Arapahoe County, Colorado
Englewood, Colorado
Littleton, Colorado
Educational institutions established in 1950
1950 establishments in Colorado